
Sejny County a unit of territorial administration and local government (powiat) in Podlaskie Voivodeship, in the extreme north-east of Poland, on the border with Lithuania and Belarus. It came into being on January 1, 1999, as a result of the Polish local government reforms passed in 1998.

As of 2019 its total population was 20,002, with Lithuanians comprising 20.2% (4,271) of the inhabitants.

Neighbouring counties
Sejny County is bordered by Augustów County to the south and Suwałki County to the west. It also borders Lithuania to the north-east and Belarus to the east.

Administrative division
The county is subdivided into five gminas (one urban and four rural). These are listed in the following table, in descending order of population.

References

 
Sejny